Lodovico Sommaruga (7 May 1928 – 23 July 2016) was an Italian rower. He competed at the 1952 Summer Olympics in Helsinki with the men's double sculls where they were eliminated in the semi-final repêchage.

References

External links

1928 births
2016 deaths 
Italian male rowers
Olympic rowers of Italy
Rowers at the 1952 Summer Olympics
European Rowing Championships medalists